Balwan Singh Daulatpuria is a member of the Haryana Legislative Assembly from the Indian National Lok Dal, representing the Fatehabad Vidhan sabha Constituency in Haryana.

References 

Haryana MLAs 2014–2019
Indian National Lok Dal politicians
People from Fatehabad district